Eric Sprott (born 1944/45) is a Canadian billionaire businessman.

Early life
Sprott has a bachelor's degree from Carleton University.

Career
Sprott started his career as a research analyst with Merrill Lynch, before becoming a fund manager. In 2001, he sold his first company, Sprott Securities, to the company's staff, and donated $10 million to Carleton University, who renamed their business school, the Sprott School of Business.

Sprott advised investors to buy gold before the 2008 financial crash. Following the financial crisis, gold rallied to a new all time high of over $2000/oz.

He was the chairman of Sprott Inc, a Toronto-based asset management firm, from 2010 to May 2017.

Sprott is a "long-time gold bull", and claims to hold 90% of his assets (except for Sprott Inc shares) in gold and silver.

Personal life
Sprott is married to Vizma Sprott  and has two children, Juliana Haver and Larisa Sprott.

References

1940s births
Living people
Canadian billionaires
Carleton University alumni